The 2018 Tour de Romandie was a road cycling stage race that took place between 24 and 29 April 2018 in Romandie, Switzerland. It was the 72nd edition of the Tour de Romandie and the nineteenth event of the 2018 UCI World Tour.

Teams
As the Tour de Romandie is a UCI World Tour event, all eighteen UCI WorldTeams were invited automatically and were obliged to enter a team in the race. Each team had a maximum of seven riders.

Route

Stages

Prologue
24 April 2018 — Fribourg, individual time trial (ITT)

Stage 1
25 April 2018 — Fribourg to Delémont,

Stage 2
26 April 2018 — Delémont to Yverdon-les-Bains,

Stage 3
27 April 2018 — Ollon to Villars-sur-Ollon, individual time trial (ITT)

Stage 4
28 April 2018 — Sion to Sion,

Stage 5
29 April 2018 — Mont-sur-Rolle to Genève,

Classification leadership table

References

External links

2018 UCI World Tour
2018 in Swiss sport
2018
April 2018 sports events in Europe